Acanthomyrmex sulawesiensis is a species of ant which is part of the genus Acanthomyrmex. Terayam, Ito & Gobin described the species in 1998, and it is native to Indonesia.

References

sulawesiensis
Insects described in 1998
Insects of Indonesia